Sarata Raion was a raion (district) in Odessa Oblast of Ukraine. It was part of the historical region of Bessarabia. Its administrative center was the urban-type settlement of Sarata. The raion was abolished and its territory was merged into Bilhorod-Dnistrovskyi Raion on 18 July 2020 as part of the administrative reform of Ukraine, which reduced the number of raions of Odessa Oblast to seven.  The last estimate of the raion population was

References

Former raions of Odesa Oblast
1965 establishments in Ukraine
Ukrainian raions abolished during the 2020 administrative reform